Joseph Henry Garagiola Jr. (born August 6, 1950) is currently the Special Advisor to Arizona Diamondbacks President & CEO Derrick Hall and formerly the Senior Vice President of Standards and On-field Operations for Major League Baseball. He was previously Senior Vice President of Baseball Operations for MLB from 2005 to 2011 and the general manager of the Arizona Diamondbacks from 1997 to 2005.

He is the son of Joe Garagiola Sr., who played catcher for the St. Louis Cardinals and Pittsburgh Pirates in the late 1940s and early 1950s. In 1973, Garagiola, along with Chris Hart, appeared on the game show To Tell the Truth as impostors pretending to be police detective Richard Buggy. Garagiola's father and Hart's mother, Kitty Carlisle, were regular panelists on the show at the time and both appeared as part of a prank on their parents. He is an alumnus of Archbishop Stepinac High School, the University of Notre Dame and Georgetown University Law Center.

References 

1950 births
Living people
American people of Italian descent
Arizona Diamondbacks executives
Georgetown University Law Center alumni
Major League Baseball central office executives
Major League Baseball general managers
Sportspeople from St. Louis
University of Notre Dame alumni